Microponics is the symbiotic integration of fish, plants, and micro-livestock in a semi-controlled environment. The term was adopted by Australian urban farmer, Gary Donaldson, in 2008, to describe his integrated backyard food production concept. While microponics was also the name given to an obscure grafting method used in hydroponics, Donaldson's use of the term was derived from the integration of micro-livestock (and micro-farming) and the production of fish and plants - aquaponics.

History
Microponics has its roots in the integrated aquaculture work undertaken by the New Alchemy Institute during the late 1960s and early 1970s. The New Alchemists had developed useful food production models based on the integration of fish, plants, ducks, rabbits, and other organisms - all of which were housed in their solar and wind-powered Cape Cod Ark bio-shelter.

Integrated aquaculture, in which the by-products (waste) of one species are converted to become the feedstock (food, fertilizer, etc.) of another species, struck an immediate chord with Donaldson when he was first introduced to it in the mid-1970s. His goal was to develop a backyard food production regime that would enable the average householder to grow their own clean fresh food through the application of modest skills and appropriate technology. He reasoned that the one thing that all plant and animal species had in common was a need for water so it seemed logical that aquaculture should become a cornerstone of any integrated backyard food production system. 

Once the New Alchemists had reconnected him with the notion of integration (largely traditional mixed farming with an appropriate technology twist), Donaldson still grappled with the issue of scale. At just under 30 meters long and 6 meters high, the Ark was rather too large for the average backyard. 

Notwithstanding the innovative approach of the New Alchemists, translation of their work into an Australian context in the 1970s was also hindered by the lack of information about the culture of Australian fish species. In the ensuing twenty years, aquaculture in Australia came of age and local researchers identified a number of suitable freshwater aquaculture species. Since 2007, Gary Donaldson has satisfied himself that limited quantities (in a backyard context) of Australian freshwater fish could be successfully grown out in as little as 600 liters of water. 

Integrated aquaculture was also the precursor to aquaponics, which was beginning to gain international momentum by the mid-2000s. Gary Donaldson found the notion of aquaponics too limiting and he continued to promote a more holistic approach to small-scale food production through the inclusion of micro-livestock. Aquaponics is, by definition, the combination of recirculating aquaculture and hydroponics for the production of fish and plants, however, microponics suggests that recirculating aquaculture can be advantageously integrated with virtually any plant growing-system. The principal issue surrounding aquaponics is (like most aquaculture) its reliance on fishmeal and oil from wild catch marine species. The greater bio-diversity inherent in microponics offers the opportunity to reduce or even eliminate this dependency.

Integrations within microponics
The integrations embodied within microponics include:

 Fish and crustaceans
 Vegetables, herbs, and fruit
 Chickens for meat and eggs
 Japanese quail
 Rabbits and other micro-livestock
 Muscovies
 Geese and other waterfowl
 Live animal protein - worms, black soldier fly larvae, mealworms
 Fodder plants - including duckweed
 Snails

Given its emphasis on backyard food production, microponics tends to focus on smaller micro-livestock species but, where space and local planning laws permit, the concept can be expanded to include traditional species such as pigs, goats, sheep, and even micro-cattle breeds like the Dexter.

Advantages
The advantages of microponics food production systems include:

 Empowerment of families to produce their own clean, fresh food. 
 Conservation through water reuse and recycling.
 Organic fertilization of plants with natural fish emulsion.
 Efficient use of space through Its small footprint.
 Reduced reliance on purchased livestock rations.
 Its value is a learning resource for students of all ages.

Disadvantages
Some disadvantages with microponics are:

 Initial expense for housing, tank, plumbing, pumps, and grow beds.
 The infinite number of ways in which a system can be configured lends itself to varying results, conflicting research, and successes or failures.
 In heavily urbanized environments, a lack of space or local regulations might limit certain possible integrations.

See also
 Horticulture
 Permaculture

References

 Paul Bryant, Kim Jauncey and Tim Atack (1981). "Backyard Fish Farm".

Horticulture